Saoud Qern (born 25 December 1987) is a Saudi football player who played in the Pro League for Al-Raed FC.

References

1987 births
Living people
Saudi Arabian footballers
Hetten FC players
Al-Raed FC players
Damac FC players
Saudi First Division League players
Saudi Professional League players
Saudi Second Division players
Association football midfielders